Cherokee Village may refer to:
 Cherokee Village, Arkansas, a city
 Cherokee Village, Tennessee, an unincorporated community

See also
 Cherokee Heritage Center, a reconstructed Cherokee village in Tahlequah, Oklahoma